The Mid-America All-Indian Center is an American museum dedicated to the history and culture of Native Americans. The museum, which is located along the Arkansas River in the Riverside neighborhood of Wichita, Kansas, is considered the only facility solely dedicated to American Indian culture in the U.S. state of Kansas.

Mission and collection
The Mid-America All-Indian Center serves as a cultural center and museum dedicated to educating people about and preserving Native Americans heritage.

The museum's collection includes the largest publicly displayed body of artwork by Blackbear Bosin, the late Kiowa-Comanche sculptor and painter. Other notable pieces in the collection include beadwork, pipe bags, jewelry, pottery, and baskets. The museum has a large collection of Alaska Native artwork from the mid-20th century, as well as flags from over 70 American Indian tribes displayed in the Gallery of Nations event space.

History
The Mid-America All-Indian Center opened in 1976 as a cultural center and provider of social services to the Native American community. The original co-founders of the museum included Betty Nixon, a Kiowa artisan who later served as the chairwoman of the center's board of directors. The Mid-America All-Indian Center's social services were later abolished, as similar programs could be provided more easily by other agencies, such as the Salvation Army or United Way of the Plains.

Jerry Martin, the current director of the Lowell D. Holmes Museum of Anthropology at Wichita State University, was the museum's director from 1989 to 1999.

By 2005, the Mid-America All-Indian Center was suffering from debt and mismanagement. The museum was suffering from a range of financial issues, including heavy debt and overdue bills. A number of artifacts were also missing from the collection.

The city of Wichita took control of the Mid-America All-Indian Center in 2005 in an effort to save the center. The city government temporarily closed the Mid-America All-Indian Center following the take-over. The Mid-America All-Indian Center took out a $175,000 loan from the city of Wichita to pay overdue bills and other expenses. It repaid the loan within two years.

The Wichita government and the Mid-America All-Indian Center also sought to trim costs and cut programs as part of the restructuring. The city reduced the center's staff from more than ten employees to just three staff members. The museum now has three full-time employees, as of 2015 – center director, April Scott; museum director, Sarah Adams; and education director, Crystal Flannery-Bachicha. City officials trimmed programs and cut the number of phone lines and websites.

City officials also commissioned a new inventory of all artifacts housed at the Mid-America All-Indian Center. The collection was recorded, photographed and digitized. The museum's computer database were upgraded and modernized for better record keeping. All of the missing items from the collection were ultimately found.

The Mid-America All-Indian Center now has an operating budget of approximately $440,000, as of 2012, with roughly 40,000 visitors per year. It brings in additional income from the rental of its entertainment and meeting spaces. The museum serves as a cultural center for the 10,000 American Indians residing in the Wichita metropolitan area, who represent seventy-two unique tribes from the Plains and other areas. The center hosts powwows and other cultural events. In 2011, the Mid-America All-Indian Center launched the first annual American Indian Festival, which is modeled after the Red Earth Festival held in Oklahoma City. The American Indian Festival was discontinued in 2015. They host fundraisers throughout the year – the two largest being the Mid-America All-Indian Center Benefit Car Show in the spring and the Mid-America All-Indian Center and Friends Culture Dash in the fall.

References

Museums established in 1976
Museums in Wichita, Kansas
Native American museums in Kansas
1976 establishments in Kansas